Fresno is a Brazilian rock band formed in Porto Alegre in late 1999. As of 2020, members are Lucas Silveira (vocals, bass, rhythm guitar, keyboards), Gustavo Mantovani (lead guitar) and Thiago Guerra (drums). They already have ten albums, the most recent being "Vou Ter Que Me Virar".

Biography

1999-2000: Early days
Lucas, Gustavo, Leandro and Pedro met in high school and were part of the student council. After a meeting in late 1999 they had the idea to start a band so they could have fun doing punk versions of pop hits of the time. Lucas and Gustavo played the guitar, Pedro had a drum kit and Leandro would be the singer.

In December 4 of that year the band gathered for the first rehearsal session at Pedro's house, in Porto Alegre. That day is regarded as "date of birth" of the band that would later call itself "Democratas" and ultimately "Fresno".

In June 2000 there was the annual band festival for that school. About a month before that, the boys invited their friend Bruno to play bass in the band and help them do well at the festival, with a setlist comprising cover songs only. It worked out well and Bruno stayed in the band. Soon after that Lucas started songwriting and the band incorporated their own compositions into the next few gigs. As early as 2001 the band was playing its own songs only - songs that would spread across the internet in the shape of rough recordings made at home by Lucas. That's when they changed their name to Fresno.

2001-2003: O Acaso do Erro (EP) and Quarto dos Livros
In 2001, after discovering another Brazilian outfit called Democratas, the band looked for a new name. After many temporary attempts, Lucas suggested Fresno during a rehearsal, as he thought the word sounded funny. It ended up sticking.

Later that year the band recorded their first EP – O Acaso do Erro, with 6 tracks including local favourites "Seu Namorado É Um Idiota" and "Se Algum Dia Eu Não Acordar". During the recordings, Leandro left the band. Lucas, who had always been the main composer, took over vocal duties and the band became a four-piece.

The EP spread in the Brazilian underground scene thanks to the Internet, and in 2003 the band recorded the independent album Quarto dos Livros, with songs like "Teu Semblante", "Desde Já"  and "Stonehenge". The recognition of this work earned Fresno invitations to perform in several Brazilian states.

"Stonehenge" was released in 2003 as the first and only single from Quarto dos Livros. The single was not released to radio but was well received amongst the growing fanbase, and is considered one of Fresno's classics.

The video for "Stonehenge" was the band's first, made as a university project (Lucas and former member Leandro still studied Advertising together at that point). It was shot mostly inside an apartment and on some streets of downtown Porto Alegre, not showing the band.

2004-2005: O Rio, A Cidade, A Árvore
In 2004 the second album is written and released: O Rio, A Cidade, A Árvore, meaning "the river, the city, the tree" and referring to other uses of the word Fresno. This CD consolidated the band in the national independent music scene and the single "Onde Está" was a huge success. It was the band's first song to get consistent airplay, thus introducing Fresno to a bigger audience. Two different videos were shot to promote this track, both independently and with the help of friends.

In 2005, Fresno starts getting invited to appear in various TV channels (MTV Brasil, Rede Globo, RBS TV). Downloads go through the roof and the group is facing the largest audiences ever seen by them in live shows.

2006-2007: Ciano
In 2006, the third independent album is released. Ciano came out with 14 tracks (11 unreleased songs and 3 re-recordings of hits from Quarto dos Livros) and it was then that the band really pushed into the mainstream, emerging on MTV with a well-produced video for the single "Quebre as Correntes", which also gained high rotation on radio stations throughout the country. Fresno appeared on cable TV station Multishow, gained prominence in the Trama Virtual music website and joined the YouTube sensation. Fresno was nominated on MTV's Brazilian Video Music Awards (known as VMB) for the Viewer's Choice category.

During this period, Bruno decides to disconnect from the band. He was replaced by Rodrigo Tavares, from a band called Abril, who was a friend of the band and had helped in the production of previous records of Fresno. The change was announced in October 2006.

After 7 years as a hard working independent band, in April 2007 Fresno finally decided to accept an offer and sign with a record label. The band then started working with nationally renowned producer Rick Bonadio.

The band was invited to record the live CD/DVD MTV Ao Vivo: 5 Bandas de Rock, along with four other bands of the so-called new generation of Brazilian rock: NX Zero, Moptop, Hateen and Forfun. This was an opportunity for the band to release a catchy new tune called "Polo"; a music video was made from the DVD footage and received considerable airplay on MTV. The song was a hit.

Also in 2007, Fresno won the Breakthrough Artist award at MTV's VMB Awards. During that ceremony, Lucas did a duet with Brazilian pop sensation Sandy singing her song "Abri os Olhos". The band also featured in Estúdio Coca-Cola playing with reggae artist Armandinho, and in a Christmas special for TV show Superpop.

2008-2010: Redenção
The year 2008 begins with the realisation of a dream: Fresno plays on the main stage of the Planeta Atlântida, one of the most anticipated (and crowded) festivals in the south of Brazil. April saw the release of Redenção, the band's fourth and the first through a major label, Arsenal Music. Soon after the launch, the first single "Uma Música", was topping charts in radio and MTV.

However, in May 2008, Pedro "Cuper", one of the Fresno's founders, leaves the band. A new drummer is soon called to fill the position: Rodrigo "Bell" Ruschel, who previously played with Tavares in Abril, took on the drumsticks.

Another Estúdio Coca-Cola mash-up session puts Fresno together with Brazilian country legends Chitãozinho & Xororó, a major milestone in the band's ascent in popularity. The partnership is a huge success and further increases Fresno's credibility, particularly with older musicians, who start to take notice.

During the last show of the year, December 14, in Espaço das Américas, Fresno receives from the hands of Rick Bonadio a Gold Record for the sales of Redenção. The band wrapped up a big year with a participation in Rede Globo's New Year special, once again along with Chitãozinho e Xororó.

For 2009, the band finally launches a DVD. O Outro Lado Da Porta brings the band's history told by its own members, interviews, videos and a studio performance with 15 songs.

The project "Bombar no posto ALE" is created and consists of surprise mini-gigs at gas stations of four Brazilian capitals (São Paulo, Rio de Janeiro, Belo Horizonte and Vitória), leading many fans behind the Fresno van to accompany the shows.

Various appearances in TV shows, radio programs, magazines and several concerts are booked across the country showing the success achieved by the band. They receive the Band of the Year award from Multishow on 18/08/09, further solidifying this momentum.

Fresno is the big winner on MTV's VMB Awards for 2009, winning 4 categories in 2009: Best Lead Singer, Best Bass Player, Best Pop Artist and Artist Of The Year.

By the end of 2009, Fresno is close to their fifth studio album, Revanche, already being recorded.

In May 2010 they released a new single from the upcoming record, called "Deixa o Tempo".

2010-2011: Revanche 
On July 13, the band released their fifth studio album, Revanche.

The album mixes heavy and fast songs ("Revanche", "Relato De Um Homem de Bom Coração") and pop ballads ("Não Leve a Mal", "Quando Crescer"). The album lyrics are mostly about love and obstacles in life.

On August 25, the bassist Tavares won the "Best Instrumentist Award" in the Multishow Brazilian Music Awards. The band also competed for the awards of "Band of the Year" and "Best DVD" with O Outro Lado Da Porta but they did not win.

The band was invited for another unusual collaboration when pop old-timers Roupa Nova planned a CD/DVD to commemorate their 30th Anniversary.

In 2011, Fresno released videos for singles "Eu Sei" and "Porto Alegre", the latter a touching look back at their hometown featuring key places, friends and family members.

2011 - present: Cemitério das Boas Intenções and Infinito
In November 2011 the band announced a four-track EP which was released near Christmas, titled Cemitério das Boas Intenções. The EP surprised fans and musical critics displaying the band in a more aggressive and raw sound.

In March 2012, to the surprise of most fans, bass player Rodrigo Tavares requested to leave the band to focus in his solo side project, Esteban.

Mário Camelo, who had been supporting Fresno live since 2008 as a keyboard player, is now a fixed member in the band, and for now they are performing with the use of a pre-recorded bass track. There are no plans at this stage to seek a replacement for Tavares on bass.

As of April 2012 the band announced they would start recording a new self-produced album. Infinito was released in November 1 via ITunes Store. The good reception amongst band fans resounded with the good critics, which praised the album for its ambitious sound. The songs were streamed in the band's YouTube channel. The lead single, Infinito, was released with the first Brazilian music video with images shot in space.

Discography

Demo albums 
 (2001) O Acaso do Erro

Studio albums 
 (2003) Quarto dos Livros
 (2004) O Rio, a Cidade, a Árvore
 (2006) Ciano
 (2008) Redenção
 (2010) Revanche
 (2012) Infinito
 (2016) A Sinfonia de Tudo Que Há
 (2019) Sua Alegria Foi Cancelada
 (2021) Vou Ter Que Me Virar

EPs 
 (2011) Cemitério das Boas Intenções
 (2014) Eu Sou a Maré Viva

Live albums 
 (2015) Fresno 15 Anos ao Vivo
 (2016) Ciano ao Vivo
 (2019) Natureza Caos: Live

Video albums 
 (2009) O Outro Lado da Porta
 (2015) Fresno 15 Anos ao Vivo

Band members

Current members
 Lucas Silveira - lead vocals (2001–present), rhythm guitar (1999–present), keyboards (1999–2010, 2021–present), studio bass (2012–present)
 Gustavo "Vavo" Mantovani - lead guitar, backing vocals (1999–present)
 Tom Vicentini - live bass (2013–present, support)
 Thiago Guerra - drums (2013–present)

Former members
 Rodrigo "Esteban" Tavares - bass, backing vocals (2006–2012)
 Pedro "Cuper" Cupertino - drums (1999-2008)
 Bruno "Lezo" Teixeira - bass, backing vocals (2000–2006)
 Leandro "Nego" Pereira - lead vocals (1999–2001)
 Rodrigo "Bell" Ruschel - drums (2008–2013)

 Mario Camelo - keyboards (2010–2021)

Timeline

Awards

2007 
 VMB (MTV Video Music Brasil awards) 
 Best New Artist

2008
 VMB (MTV Video Music Brasil awards) 
 Video U Made: Fábio Vianas home-made video for "Uma Música"

2009
 Prêmio Multishow de Música Brasileira (Multishow Brazilian Music Awards)  Band of the Year
 VMB (MTV Video Music Brasil awards)  Artist of the Year
 Pop
 Dream Band—Best Vocalist: Lucas "Paraíba" Silveira
 Dream Band—Best Bassist: Rodrigo "Esteban" Tavares

2010
 Prêmio Multishow de Música Brasileira - PMMB (Multishow Brazilian Music Awards)Best Instrumentist: Rodrigo "Esteban" Tavares

2013EMA (Europe Music Awards)'''''
 Worldwide Act Latin America

References

External links
 Official site 
 Official fotolog 
 Band's profile on Myspace
 Band's profile on TramaVirtual 

 
Musical groups established in 1999
Emo musical groups
Brazilian rock music groups
Musical groups from Porto Alegre
1999 establishments in Brazil
Rap rock groups